Television Centre (TVC) is a building complex in White City, West London, that was the headquarters of BBC Television between 1960 and 2013. After a refurbishment, the complex reopened in 2017 with three studios in use for TV production, operated by BBC Studioworks. The first BBC staff moved into the Scenery Block in 1953, and the centre was officially opened on 29 June 1960. It is one of the most readily recognisable facilities of its type, having appeared as the backdrop for many BBC programmes. Parts of the building are Grade II listed, including the central ring and Studio 1.

Most of the BBC's national television and radio news output came from Television Centre, and in later years most recorded television was output from the nearby Broadcast Centre at 201 Wood Lane, care of Red Bee Media. Live television events from studios and routing of national and international sporting events took place within Television Centre before being passed to the Broadcast Centre for transmission.

The nearest Underground stations are White City on the Central Line and Wood Lane on the Circle and Hammersmith & City Lines.

History

On Friday 1 April 1949, Norman Collins, the Controller of the BBC Television Service, announced at the Television Society's annual dinner at The Waldorf Hilton, London that a new TV centre would be built in Shepherd's Bush. London broadcasts at the time came from Alexandra Palace and Lime Grove Studios (from 1949). It was to be the largest television centre in the world.

It was planned to be , but turned out to be twice the size. The building was commissioned in 1949 with work starting in 1950. However government restrictions on building, through its loan sanction and licensing of materials, ensured that building work was halted until 1953. Intended as stopgaps, the BBC remodelled the former Gaumont Studios at Lime Grove, the Riverside Studios in Hammersmith and the Shepherd's Bush Empire for television production spaces and studio use; many of these facilities were still being used by the corporation decades later.

Work resumed in 1953 on the TVC scenery block (Stage 1) and work began in 1954 on the canteen block (Stage 2), which doubled as a rehearsal space. Work on Stage 3, the central circular office block and studios, began in March 1955 on studios TC4, 5 and 2. The shells of studios TC1, TC6 and TC7 were constructed around the same time but they were not fitted out until a few years later. BBC Television Centre officially opened with TC3 operational on 29 June 1960. When it opened in June 1960, the Director of BBC television was Gerald Beadle, and the first programme broadcast was First Night with David Nixon in Studio Three.

In 1997, the BBC News Centre was opened, in a new complex at the front of the building. The decision to move radio news to this building was attributed to Director General John Birt, a move that was resisted by the managing director of BBC Radio, Liz Forgan, who resigned after failing to dissuade the governors.

Redevelopment

It was announced on 18 October 2007 that in order to meet a £2 billion shortfall in funding, the BBC intended to "reduce the size of the property portfolio in west London by selling BBC Television Centre by the end of the financial year 2012/13", with the then Director General, Mark Thompson, saying the plan would deliver "a smaller, but fitter, BBC" in the digital age. A BBC spokesman has added that "this is a full scale disposal of BBC Television Centre and we won't be leasing it back". The corporation officially put Television Centre on the property market in June 2011.

BBC Sport and BBC Children's moved to dock10, MediaCityUK in Salford Quays in 2012, with Children's Learning, Radio 5 Live and part of BBC Future Media & Technology. The move saw up to 1,500 posts at TV Centre and 700 posts at New Broadcasting House relocate to Salford Quays. BBC Breakfast, part of BBC News, moved to Salford in April 2012.

On 16 July 2012, the BBC agreed to sell the site to Stanhope for £200 million. The building closed on 31 March 2013 and was redeveloped to include flats, office space, a cinema and hotels. Studios 1, 2 and 3 along with part of the basement and offices have been refurbished and leased back to the BBC on a 15-year lease. The original schedule would have seen Studios 1, 2, & 3 back in production by Autumn of 2014 however on 17 July 2014 the BBC announced that due to the extensive building work, programme production would not recommence at Television Centre until 2017 when much of the demolition and groundwork has been completed. The BBC's commercial business, BBC Studios, will lease back Stage 6 as office space which is the part formerly occupied by BBC News.

All BBC News, national radio and BBC World Service broadcasts were relocated to Broadcasting House between July 2012 and March 2013, which is said to include one of the largest live newsrooms in the world. The final news broadcasts from Television Centre took place on 18 March 2013, when the BBC News channel and remaining news output completed the move to Broadcasting House. This was one of the final live broadcasts from the building.

A 90-minute documentary titled Tales of Television Centre was broadcast on BBC Four in 2012 ahead of the move out. On 22 March 2013, BBC Four devoted its evening schedule to programmes commemorating Television Centre. At the heart of the evening was Goodbye Television Centre, a two-hour history presented by former BBC One controller and BBC chairman Michael Grade. The last live programme broadcast was Madness Live: Goodbye Television Centre, shown that day on BBC Four.

In March 2013, the BBC and Stanhope formed a joint venture, Television Centre Developments, to manage the redevelopment of the 14-acre site. Only three of the eight production studios were earmarked for continued use by the BBC, with the rest being demolished for flats, and it was argued that this would leave insufficient facilities in the capital for independent television production, and a Save Television Centre Studios website and petition was set up.

In December 2013, Stanhope was granted planning permission from the London Borough of Hammersmith & Fulham.

In October 2014, UK magazine Private Eye reported that having spent £60 million to remove broadcasting equipment from the building, the BBC planned to spend £12 million a year to lease back parts of the building. This decision was in direct contradiction of the BBC's promise in 2007 that the sale of TVC was a "full-scale disposal" and that it would not be leasing back any part of the building.

Demolition work began in February 2015.

As of April 2016, only Studios TC1, TC2 and TC3 remained – the other studios TC4, TC5, TC6, TC7 and TC8 had all been demolished. The statue of Helios, the Greek God of Sun, had been removed for renovation before it returned later in 2016; developer Stanhope and construction manager Mace had carefully removed the gilded bronze figure with heritage experts PAYE Conservation for repair and renovation. The Helios has stood in the rotunda at Television Centre since the former BBC headquarters opened in 1960.

Reopening
BBC Studioworks, the commercial subsidiary of the BBC operate and maintain Studios 1, 2 and 3 and the  production facilities at Television Centre. The newly refurbished facilities officially opened on 1 September 2017. As of April 2017, bookings for the renovated studios were being taken.

The first programme to transmit live from the newly refurbished studios was Strictly Come Dancing: It Takes Two on BBC Two on Monday 25 September 2017. It was hosted by Zoe Ball.

In April 2018, ITV's daytime programmes Good Morning Britain, Lorraine, This Morning,  Loose Women and political discussion programme Peston moved to Television Centre, due to the closure and redevelopment of The London Studios. However, in October 2018, it was announced that ITV would not be returning to the South Bank, and it is thought that ITV Daytime programmes will continue to be broadcast from Television Centre.

On 29 June 2020, Television Centre turned 60 years old and the Royal Television Society released a commemorative programme to celebrate.

The building

Design

The overall design from the air appeared to resemble a question mark in shape. The architect, Graham Dawbarn, CBE (Norman & Dawbarn), drew a question mark on an envelope (now held by the BBC Written Archives Centre) while thinking about the design of the building, and realised that it would be an ideal shape for the site. An article in The BBC Quarterly, July 1946, proposed a circular design, several years before Dawbarn drew up his plans.

The building featured a central circular block (officially known as the Main Block, but often referred to by staff as the "doughnut") around which were studios, offices, engineering areas and the News Centre.  The circular shape allowed similar length video signal cables from all of the studios to the central VT area, allowing analogue TV signals to remain synchronised between the different studios for multi-studio broadcasts.

Helios

In the centre of the main block was a statue designed by T. B. Huxley-Jones of Helios, the Greek god of the sun, to symbolise the radiation of television around the world. At the foot of the statue were two reclining figures, symbolising sound and vision, the components of television. It was originally a fountain, but owing to the building's unique shape it was too noisy for the staff in the overlooking offices, and there were problems with water leakage into the videotape area which for a long time was directly beneath. Even though there was a foundation stone marked 'BBC 1956' in the basement of the main building, construction began in 1951.

Arthur Hayes worked on the building from 1956 to 1970 and was responsible for the creation of the original  'BBC Television Centre' lettering on the façade of Studio 1. The lettering was later used all over the building, even in tile work outside lift entrances. Demands from Broadcasting House meant that Hayes had less time than he had thought to design a decor for the façade, leading to him puncturing a scale foam model of the wall with drawing pins, and thus the birth of the iconic 'Atomic Dots': there are 26 across the façade of Studio 1, each one backlit and clearly visible at night.

The building as opened in 1960 was extended a number of times, notably along the 'spur' towards Wood Lane in line with the original masterplan although the actual implementation was completed over a number of decades and by different architects. Despite a number of extensions, the BBC had to seek accommodation elsewhere, such as the nearby BBC White City complex comprising White City One, a 25,000 square metre office building, and the adjacent Broadcast and Media Centres.

Listed status
The development of the Westfield shopping centre nearby led to a sharp rise in property prices and placed the Television Centre under threat. In February 2008, with an amendment in November, English Heritage requested listed status for the scenery workshop, the canteen block adjoining the Blue Peter Garden, and the central building. Previously, under a longstanding deal between the BBC and English Heritage the building was not listed to allow the BBC to make changes necessary in a broadcasting centre. In return, the BBC agreed that if it left, the fabric of the building would be restored to its mid-1960s state, and English Heritage would list notable features.

On 17 June 2009 the Central Ring of the building and Studio 1, noting in particular the John Piper mosaic, central drum with its mosaic tiles, the Huxley-Jones gilded statue of Helios, full-height glazing of the stair and original clock in the Central Ring, received Grade II listed status from the Department for Culture, Media and Sport. The 'atomic dots' and name of Studio 1, and the cantilevered porch on its exterior were noted as important architectural features of that building. The department did not consider the other buildings, including all other studios, scenery block and canteen of sufficient special interest to warrant listing. Making the protection announcement, the architecture minister Barbara Follett noted that it was where Doctor Who, Fawlty Towers and Blue Peter were made: "It has been a torture chamber for politicians, and an endless source of first-class entertainment for the nation—sometimes both at the same time."

Current studios

Currently, and in the later years of the BBC's occupation of the centre, the studio facilities were run by the wholly owned commercial subsidiary BBC Studioworks. The studios vary in size and all studios were usually abbreviated to initials, such as TC1 (Television Centre 1) for Studio 1.

The studios have hosted a wide variety of television programmes covering a diverse range of genres for a range of broadcasters. Notable productions hosted at the centre prior to 2013 include Strictly Come Dancing, Harry Hill's TV Burp, Match of the Day, Later... with Jools Holland, Miranda, The Alan Titchmarsh Show, The Armstrong & Miller Show, 8 Out of 10 Cats as well as big complex live productions such as Children in Need and Comic Relief. Classic BBC productions hosted at the site include some of Britain's best known television programmes including Fawlty Towers, Monty Python's Flying Circus, Blue Peter, Absolutely Fabulous, the original Doctor Who series and most of the best known BBC drama series.

From the 1980s the use of the complex for such productions declined with the last major drama series to be shot there being The House of Eliott, which ended in 1994, and the last single drama recorded was Henry IV, Part 1, in 1995. The reason for the decline was because drama productions (except for soap operas) shifted almost entirely onto film or single-camera video, and Television Centre was a video-based, multi-camera production environment.

Studio 1

995 square metres (10,250 ft2)

Opened on 15 April 1964 and was the fourth largest television studio in Britain (following Fountain Studios' Studio A&B, dock10's Studio 1 and The Maidstone Studios' Studio 1), and was equipped for HDTV production (as were Studio 4, Studio 6 and Studio 8). Studio 1 hosted the 2,000th program of the Spanish talk show El Hormiguero with Will Smith.

In May 2020, Loose Women temporarily moved from TC2 into TC1 to allow for social distancing during the COVID-19 pandemic. In mid-July, Loose Women returned to TC2.

Programmes recorded or transmitted included:

Sounds Like Friday Night
The Graham Norton Show
Ant and Dec's Saturday Night Takeaway
The Jonathan Ross Show
The Russell Howard Hour
Blind Date
BBC Radio 1's Teen Awards
The Last Leg

Studio 2
223 square metres (2,400 ft2)

Opened in late 1960, it housed comedy programmes such as That Was the Week That Was. It was not initially converted to colour and closed in 1969, with the space being used as storage, but reopened in 1981. It was used by BBC News until they moved in 1997, and has played host to the Sport and Children's department. It was the main studio used for Blue Peter for the 2007 and 2008 series. It was vacated following the move of both departments to dock10. Studio 2 is currently the home of the ITV programmes Lorraine, Loose Women and Peston, in addition to Channel 4's Sunday Brunch.

Studio 3
594 square metres (6,390 ft2)

Opened on 29 June 1960, it was designed as a drama studio and had customised panels and fittings. The walls were slightly thicker to insulate it from noise from the Circle line and Hammersmith & City line (then still part of the Metropolitan line) of the London Underground. It was the first studio to be completed and was upgraded to colour in 1969. Studio 3 currently broadcasts ITV programmes Good Morning Britain and This Morning. It was one of two studios that hosted the Eurovision Song Contest 1963; the other being Studio 4.

Former studios

Studio 0
117 square metres (1,260 ft2)

Opened in 1989 as a music studio, with what would later become Studio 12 as its control room; Productions included for UK Play and during its later life was equipped for producing virtual reality programmes. It was home to Liquid News between 2000 and 2002 and CBeebies in vision continuity between 2002 and 2008. After that it was used by BBC Research.

Studio 4
585 square metres (6,300 ft2)

Opened in January 1961, TC4 was similar in design and layout to its neighbour, TC3. It was designed as a light entertainment studio and contained a rather unusual sound system called ambiophony. It was upgraded to colour in 1970 and to HD and surround sound in 2008.

Programmes recorded or transmitted included:

Never Mind the Buzzcocks
Later... with Jools Holland
Embarrassing Bodies: Live from the Clinic
Harry Hill's TV Burp
A Question of Sport
Celebrity Mastermind
The Alan Titchmarsh Show
Room 101
Strictly Come Dancing
Noel's House Party
Parkinson
Dead Ringers
Little Britain
Clarkson
Record Breakers
Only Fools and Horses
Blackadder
Friday Night with Jonathan Ross.
The Hairy Bikers' Cook Off
The Paul Daniels Magic Show
The Hitchhiker's Guide to the Galaxy
The National Lottery: In It to Win It
The Impressions Show with Culshaw and Stephenson
The Forsyte Saga
Blue Peter
Sam & Mark's Big Friday Wind-Up
Yes Minister-Yes Prime Minister
Z-Cars
Play for Today
Golden Balls
Top of the Pops

Studio 5
223 square metres (2,400 ft2)

Opened in August 1961, it was used for the first half of its life by broadcasts from BBC Schools. There was an adjacent area used for schools programming that linked in with the studio. It was converted to colour around 1973, about the same time as schools broadcasts as a whole. It was closed briefly during the mid-1980s, and reopened in 1987 following a two-year refurbishment. It was the home of BBC Sport's programmes until November 2011 when the Sports department moved to MediaCityUK.

TC5 hosted an experimental session in 1963 to create video ‘howlaround’ footage for ‘Doctor Who’, although only a small amount was used in the original title sequence as transmitted.

Programmes recorded or transmitted included:

Match of the Day
Football Focus
Crimewatch
Jackanory
Grandstand
Ask the Family
Call My Bluff
Holiday
Watchdog
Play School
The Old Grey Whistle Test

Studio 6

598 square metres (6,440 ft2)

Opened in July 1967 to coincide with BBC Two's switch to colour. It was the first to be equipped with colour cameras. It was a strange design: it was originally designed to be split in two by a large removable wall, but this idea was abandoned. The gallery was moved in 1993 and the old gallery became home to the BBC Red Button control room. Upgraded to HD in July 2010, the first 3D capable studio in the UK. Home to children's programmes Live & Kicking and Dick & Dom in da Bungalow, and Pointless.

Programmes recorded or transmitted included:

Pointless
Mock the Week
Never Mind the Buzzcocks
Alan Carr: Chatty Man
The Paul O'Grady Show
8 Out of 10 Cats
10 O'Clock Live
Chris Moyles' Quiz Night
Live & Kicking
The Saturday Show
Dick & Dom in da Bungalow
The Liver Birds
My Family
Pennies from Heaven
Doctor Who 
The Good Life
The Goodies
Rentaghost
Blue Peter
Juliet Bravo
Bomber Harris
A Bit of Fry & Laurie
They Think It's All Over
Rory Bremner
Two Pints of Lager and a Packet of Crisps
Big Break

Studio 7

223 square metres (2,400 ft2)

Opened in 1962 and was used for a variety of programmes. Home to children's programming such as Going Live!, before being home to BBC News in 1997. It was the home of the BBC Breakfast programme until 2012 and the BBC News at Six bulletin until 2013, with other bulletins based at N6 in the News Centre. It was vacated on 15 March 2013, following the refit of the extension to Broadcasting House, to where the BBC News department and newsroom moved.

Programmes recorded or transmitted included:

Business Breakfast
BBC Breakfast
Working Lunch
HARDtalk
Newsround
Sportsround
Newsnight
Newsnight Review
Match of the Day Kickabout
The Andrew Marr Show
Breakfast with Frost
On the Record
The Politics Show
BBC News at Six
Swap Shop
Saturday Superstore
Going Live!
Butterflies
To the Manor Born
Play School
Bob's Full House
ChuckleVision
Shooting Stars
The Stand Up Show
The Late Show
Bodger & Badger

Studio 8
602 square metres (6,480 ft2)

Opened in 1967, considered the best studio for television producers to use. It was the size that most programmes wanted and, building on the experience when building the other studios, was the best. It became the studio for comedy and sitcoms, because of its audience seating arrangements and size. It was converted to HD in January 2007.

Programmes recorded or transmitted included:

Miranda
Not Going Out
Never Mind the Buzzcocks
Tipping Point
A Question of Sport
Piers Morgan's Life Stories
Five Minutes to a Fortune
Pets Nation
Morecambe and Wise
The Dick Emery Show
Sykes
The Two Ronnies
Absolutely Fabulous
Monty Python's Flying Circus
Keeping Up Appearances
Are You Being Served?
It Ain't Half Hot Mum
Open All Hours
Citizen Smith
Up Pompeii!
Porridge
In Sickness and in Health
The Les Dawson Show
Fawlty Towers
The Fall and Rise of Reginald Perrin
Not the Nine O'Clock News
Blankety Blank
Bread
Hi-de-Hi!
The Russ Abbot Show
Alas Smith and Jones
'Allo 'Allo!
Birds of a Feather
May to December
Just Good Friends
Hole in the Wall
Ever Decreasing Circles
Victoria Wood: As Seen on TV
French and Saunders
One Foot in the Grave
Knowing Me Knowing You with Alan Partridge
Dinnerladies
Auntie's Bloomers
The National Lottery Draws
The Catherine Tate Show

Studio 9
84 square metres (900 ft2)

Built in 1955 as a foyer area of the restaurant block, becoming a store area, converted to a studio in 1996 for Children's BBC. The location was highly convenient: it allowed the invision continuity to be relocated from the "Broom Cupboard" (continuity announcer's booth) to a roomier studio. It opened onto the Blue Peter Garden allowing presentation to take place there. It was an odd shape, and was used for invision continuity for CBBC until 2004, when they broadcast links for the CBBC Channel only. All invision continuity was dropped in 2006, and it was used for programmes such as Sam & Mark's TMi Friday and SMart.

Studio 10
111 square metres (1,200 ft2)

Opened as N1 in September 1969, it was used for the BBC1 daytime news bulletins, and the home of BBC World (previously BBC World Service News) from 1993. Closed in spring 1999 when news bulletins moved to the News Centre section of Television Centre, and renamed as TC10. Used for some programmes by channel UK Play until the station's closure. Between 2004 and 2006 it was used for in-vision continuity for CBBC on BBC One and BBC Two, before being used by some programming for CBBC such as Level Up. From 2010 to 2011 it was the home of CBeebies.

Studio 11
186 square metres (2,000 ft2)

Opened as N2 in September 1969, and the same size as N1, it was used for the BBC2 daytime news bulletins. Extended in 1985 to include props store and adjacent lobby, it became home to the Six O'Clock and Nine O'Clock News. In spring 1999, following the completion of the News Centre spur of Television Centre, the news moved out and it was renamed TC11. In 2002 it became home to Liquid News and later to the other BBC Three news programmes 60 Seconds and The 7 O'Clock News. It briefly played host to the domestic BBC News bulletins while their studios were refurbished in 2006, before becoming general purpose. It was home to Strictly Come Dancing: It Takes Two until 15 December 2011, after which the studio was closed.

Studio 12
56 square metres (600 ft2)

Originally built as a control room for the music studio originally located in Studio 0. Studio 12 was converted into an ad-hoc studio in 2004 for CBBC programmes, most notably for the interactive "live cartoon" series Nelly Nut Live! which aired from 2003 to 2005. It was also used for Sportsround for some years, but was eventually converted into a presentation studio in 2006. It was used for in-vision continuity for CBBC and changed into an in-vision continuity studio in summer 2007. The set was transferred to a mini studio in the East Tower. It was used by BBC Research.

Pres A
65 square metres (704 ft2)

Opened in 1960, designed for in-vision continuity for BBC 1, but was used as such for only three years. Became weather studio prior to the move to the BBC Weather Centre in 1990 (also in Television Centre), following which it was used by Children's BBC to supplement presentation from the 'Broom Cupboard', and was used for slots such as birthdays and public holidays. It became full-time home of Children's BBC in 1994 following the vacation of the 'Broom Cupboard'. It closed following CBBC's move to TC9 and was converted into additional presentation control rooms.  The substantially thick wall between Pres A and B was removed and a mezzanine floor constructed to house a larger presentation control area for interactive and children's channels CBBC and CBeebies.

Pres B
65 square metres (704 ft2)

Opened in 1964, Pres B was designed for in-vision continuity for BBC 2, but that channel did not use in-vision continuity for more than a few months after launch. Became a general purpose studio housing small productions such as Points of View, the Film series with Barry Norman and The Old Grey Whistle Test. It closed in 1996 and initially remained disused until it was converted (along with Pres A) into additional presentation control rooms.  The substantially thick wall between Pres A and B was removed and a mezzanine floor constructed to house a larger presentation control area for interactive and children's channels CBBC and CBeebies.

News studios
In addition to these studios, BBC News used a number of studios for the frequent news bulletins. These studios have a different naming system owing to their permanent usage and were not included on most studio lists, as they were unavailable for hire.

 N1 – Previously BBC One daytime bulletins. Became TC10
 N2 – Previously BBC Two daytime bulletins. Became TC11
 N3 – Small studio off main newsroom, before being made part of newsroom, separated by glass panels.
 N4 – Studio, became part of the BBC Club bar
 N5 – Originally studio for BBC Arabic Television service, which closed in 1996. It was a storeroom until 2001 when it was used for the BBCi service, then from 2007 as a home for Click prior to its move to Broadcasting House in 2012.
 N6 – Formerly home to BBC News at One, BBC News at Ten and the BBC News channel.
 N8 – Home to BBC World News prior to its move to Broadcasting House in 2013, and by the BBC News channel from 1999 to 2008. BBC News channel still used the studio to allow the BBC News at Ten to rehearse in N6 until 2013
 N9 – Home to BBC World News until 2008 and BBC News 24 from 1997 to 1999, used as a contingency when N6/N8 unavailable due to technical work and for election coverage
 N10 – Formerly used by BBC Three to produce 60 Seconds

These studios were located in Stage 5 & Stage 6, commonly known as the BBC News Centre.  BBC News moved out of Stage 6 in 2013 to the new BBC News Centre at New Broadcasting House in Central London.  After redevelopment, Stage 6 became the new home to the commercial arm of the BBC, BBC Studios.

There was no N7, to avoid confusion with TC7, which housed 'big' news programmes such as BBC Breakfast, Working Lunch, and Newsnight.

Infrastructure

In February 1996, the electricity and heating were transferred to a European Gas Turbines (EGT) 4.9MWe Typhoon gas turbine combined heating, power and cooling unit. It included a 6MW Thermax air conditioning (cooling) vapour absorption machine (VAM). The £6m HVAC system reduced energy costs by 35%, and paid for itself within three years. A second turbine was added, without a second chimney. However, in 2008 the BBC admitted that the energy system was being used for emergency purposes only as it had become cost-ineffective to use full-time. Excess electricity produced at night has not been returned to the National Grid, as originally planned. In November 2003, the turbine's chimneys caught fire, bringing TV output to a halt. After the fire the turbines were no longer used regularly.

Recent productions

BBC productions

 BBC Radio 1 Teen Awards (TC1: Nov 2019)
 The Graham Norton Show (TC1: 2018–present)
 Later... with Jools Holland (1992-2012; TC1: 2019–present)
 Mock the Week (TC4: 2005–2012; TC1: 2018–2022)
 QI (TC1: 2019–present)
 Sounds Like Friday Night (TC1: 2017–2018)
 Strictly Come Dancing: It Takes Two (TC2: 2017)
 Top Gear  (Central Courtyard: 2021)

ITV productions

 The Chase (TC1: Celebrity Specials, 2019)
 Good Morning Britain (TC3: 2018–present)
 The Jonathan Ross Show (TC1: 2017–present)
 Loose Women (TC2: 2018–present)
 Lorraine (TC2: 2018–present)
 This Morning (TC3: 2018–present)
 Peston (TC2: 2018–present)
 Ant & Dec's Saturday Night Takeaway (TC1: 2020—present)

Other productions

 The Big Narstie Show (TC1: 2018–present)
 Blind Date (TC1: 2017–2018)
 El Hormiguero (TC1: Special, 2019)
 The Great British Bake Off: An Extra Slice (TC1: 2018–present)
 The Russell Howard Hour (TC1: 2017–present)
 Sunday Brunch (TC2: 2019–present)
 The Last Leg (TC1: 2018–2021)
 Your Face or Mine? (TC1: 2019–present)

Major events

Terrorist target

On 4 March 2001, a bomb placed outside the news centre exploded, with no fatalities. It was attributed to the Real IRA and the culprits were eventually caught. The front of the building suffered moderate damage, but was soon repaired.

Power failures
Television Centre has suffered from power cuts that affected normal broadcasting, but these were not seen as a systemic problem. One such power cut caused the launch night of BBC2, on 20 April 1964, to be cancelled; programmes began the next day.

A major power failure occurred on 20 June 2000 at approximately 5 p.m., affecting the entire Television Centre resulting in services such as BBC Two and BBC Radio 4 coming off air, and BBC News 24 went off air before being relocated to the BBC's Westminster studios. The Six O'Clock News suffered severe lighting problems and had to be cancelled halfway through, and the BBC's backup generator caught fire. Troubles were experienced in the South East region, as Newsroom South East started later than planned. The fire alarms went off at Television Centre later that day, leaving only a skeleton crew. Eventually many programmes returned, from different locations: Newsnight was presented from the main news studio with intermittent technical problems. The issues were attributed to a failing substation in Shepherd's Bush. Normal services resumed the following day.

Just before 8 a.m. on 28 November 2003 an electrical fault caused some equipment to overheat, which set off fire alarms. Although there was no fire, the fault caused widespread power cuts and prevented backup generators from providing alternative power. All output was affected with services transferred across London to alternative studios. The One O'Clock News and BBC News 24 broadcast for much of the day from the BBC's Millbank Studios, and the Today programme and Five Live's Breakfast morning radio shows fell off air for 15 minutes. The Millbank Studios are a fall-back for news operations in the event of TVC failure, and are continually recording the last hour of the BBC News Channel output (without in-vision clock) for this purpose. This power cut came on the week prior to the relaunch of News 24, which was postponed for another week to ensure that all problems had been remedied.

Protests

Programmes have been interrupted by protesters gaining access to Television Centre. In 1988, a group of lesbian protestors campaigning against Section 28 of the Local Government Act 1988 gained access to the studio of the Six O'Clock News during a live broadcast. Newsreader Sue Lawley continued with the broadcast, while co-presenter Nicholas Witchell tackled the intruders off-camera.

On 20 May 2006 during the live broadcast of National Lottery: Jet Set the studio was invaded by members of the Fathers 4 Justice campaign group, causing the show to go briefly off air while the protesters were removed. This was also a problem as that night's lottery broadcast ran straight into the Eurovision Song Contest 2006.

For Question Time on 22 October 2009, the BBC invited the leader of the British National Party, Nick Griffin, onto the programme for the first time causing heated public debate and strong protests outside the studios. Television Centre had its security breached with around 30 anti-fascist protesters storming the reception area and several hundred protesters gathering outside. Police and security staff were forced to close gates leading into the centre and form barriers to prevent any further breaches of security.

On 9 August 2021 a number of anti-vaccine protestors upset with BBC News for "promoting Covid-19 vaccines" attempted to gain access to Television Centre. The BBC's news operations were not on site as they had left the facility in 2013. Police were deployed to prevent the protestors entering BBC Studioworks, and some of the protesters later marched to Broadcasting House where BBC News is based.

References

External links

 BBC Studioworks - operate the remaining studios on site
 Television Centre - official website for the redevelopment
 TV Studio History Unofficial History of BBC Television Centre
 GES046 – BBC TV Centre (Trip 1) Guerrilla Exploring, Unofficial Insider Tour – a look around the building and behind the scenes in 2011

Television Centre London
Television Centre
Cultural and educational buildings in London
Television in London
Buildings and structures completed in 1960
Grade II listed buildings in the London Borough of Hammersmith and Fulham
White City, London
Tourist attractions in the London Borough of Hammersmith and Fulham